Bizhbulyaksky District (Bişbüläk rayonı; , Pişpülek rayonĕ; , Bişbüläk rayonı) is an administrative and municipal district (raion), one of the fifty-four in the Republic of Bashkortostan, Russia. It is located in the west of the republic and borders with Belebeyevsky District in the north, Alsheyevsky District in the northeast, Miyakinsky District in the east, Orenburg Oblast in the south and west, and with Yermekeyevsky District in the northwest. Its administrative center is the rural locality (a selo) of Bizhbulyak. As of the 2010 Census, the total population of the district was 26,080, with the population of Bizhbulyak accounting for 24.7% of that number.

History
The district was established in 1930.

Administrative and municipal status
Within the framework of administrative divisions, Bizhbulyaksky District is one of the fifty-four in the Republic of Bashkortostan. The district is divided into thirteen selsoviets, comprising eighty-five rural localities. As a municipal division, the district is incorporated as Bizhbulyaksky Municipal District. Its thirteen selsoviets are incorporated as thirteen rural settlements within the municipal district. The selo of Bizhbulyak serves as the administrative center of both the administrative and municipal district.

See also
Zirikly

References

Notes

Sources

Districts of Bashkortostan
States and territories established in 1930